The Contemporary Austin, originally known as the Austin Museum of Art, is Austin, Texas's primary contemporary art museum, consisting of two locations and an art school. The Contemporary Austin reflects the spectrum of contemporary art through exhibitions, commissions, education, and the collection. Locally, the museum is often referred to as The Contemporary.

History 
In 1911, the Texas Fine Arts Association (TFAA) was formed. Through the years, TFAA acquired the Laguna Gloria Art Museum, later becoming the Austin Museum of Art (AMOA) and the Jones Center for Contemporary Art, which later changed to Arthouse at the Jones Center. In November 2011, AMOA celebrated 50 years in the community and merged with Arthouse at the Jones Center, rejoining the two primary organizations that constituted the TFAA. The Contemporary Austin is the result of the transformation of a century-old museum and school, AMOA-Arthouse, into a new entity with a distinctive vision and mission to unite the museum's two major venues, Laguna Gloria and the Jones Center.

The Contemporary Austin – Jones Center on Congress Avenue 

Designed by architects Lewis.Tsurumaki.Lewis, The Contemporary Austin – Jones Center includes 5,100 square feet of exhibition space, along with a community room and roof-top deck for events and educational programming. In 2015 it was announced that the building would undergo a renovation and expansion that will bring the total exhibition space to more than 7,000 square feet and add a permanent, 21-foot-high canopy to the roof top space.

The Contemporary Austin – Laguna Gloria 

The museum still maintains its original home on the Clara Driscoll estate, where it was known for 34 years as Laguna Gloria Art Museum. Once owned by Stephen F. Austin, the Laguna Gloria site has been declared a national treasure and is on city, state, and national registers of historic places. Visitors can view the restored 1916 Italianate-style Driscoll Villa that was the home of Texas legend and Laguna Gloria founder Clara Driscoll. The site consists of 14-acres overlooking Lake Austin, and, in addition to the historic Driscoll Villa, includes the Gatehouse Gallery and the Betty and Edward Marcus Sculpture Park at Laguna Gloria, where visitors may view temporary, long-term, and permanent contemporary sculpture and art installations.

Laguna Gloria is also home to The Contemporary Austin's Art School, one of the largest museum-affiliated schools in the nation, where classes are taught year-round to adults and children.

The Art School at Laguna Gloria 
Located at The Contemporary Austin's lakeside Laguna Gloria site, the Art School has an enrollment of just under 5,000 students and offers scholarships to approximately 50 students per year. Docent-led school tours serve roughly 10,000 students annually (many from several Title 1 schools).

Crit Group 
The Contemporary Austin hosts an annual professional development program for artists working in all disciplines living and working in Travis County. Crit Group is led by a roster of curator mentors, including Sterling Allen, Annette DiMeo Carlozzi, and Andrea Mellard. 

Complete list of alumni include Adrian Aguilera; Emma Hadzi Antich; Annie Arnold; Amy Bench; Christa Blackwood; Ted Carey; Sandy Carson; Veronica Ceci; Christina Coleman; Jonas Criscoe; Bug Davidson; Rakhee Jain Desai; Lydia Garcia; Christine Garvey; Ron Geibel; Rebecca Rothfus Harrell; Jenn Hassin; Sarah Hill; Katy Horan; Madeline Irvine; Calder Kamin; Masumi Kataoka; Lauren Klotzman; Josef Kristofoletti; Dameon Lester; Betelhem Makonnen; Rebecca Marino; Paloma Mayorga; R. Eric McMaster; Deborah Mersky; Virginia Lee Montgomery; Olivia Martin Moore; Michael Muelhaupt; Manik Raj Nakra; Teruko Nimura; Dawn Okoro; Steve Parker; Everest Pipkin; Sean Ripple; Alexandra Robinson; Saul Jerome E. San Juan; Amy Scofield; Amber Shields; Rachel Wolfson Smith; Pat Snow; Matthew Steinke; Michael Stephen; Sherwin Tibayan; Glenn Twiggs; Sara Vanderbeek; Cheyenne Weaver; Jenn Wilson.

Clara Driscoll 
Known as "The Savior of the Alamo", Clara Driscoll was born on April 2, 1881, in St. Mary's, Texas, on Copano Bay, to wealthy ranchers Robert and Julia Fox Driscoll.

In 1903, she paid the thousands of dollars necessary to prevent the sale of the Alamo convent to a hotel firm, earning her the title "Savior of the Alamo". Until then, the only Alamo property owned by the state was the mission church, acquired in 1883. She was reimbursed by the Texas Legislature in 1905 and the entire Alamo property was given over to the safekeeping of the Daughters of the Republic of Texas.

In 1906, Driscoll married editor and publisher of the Austin American-Statesman newspaper, Hal Sevier. The couple purchased the Laguna Gloria property in 1914, because it reminded them of Lake Como in Italy where they had honeymooned a few years earlier. In 1916 they built a home on the land, designed by San Antonio architect Harvey L. Page. They named it Laguna Gloria in part after one of her family's ranches in Duval County, "La Gloria". The site's proximity to water is most likely the reason they referred to it as a lagoon. In 1926, Driscoll reflected on the site:
I have struggled to make this little home site...into a passably presentable garden of lawns and shrubs and flowers, intersected by paths and steps, with...glimpses and balustrades, and a few oil jars of ancient and accepted design. I have placed in...a proper setting a number of really beautiful and graceful statues which I was fortunate enough to obtain from one of the oldest and finest gardens in old Italy; this to give an Old World touch to an incomparably beautiful Texas landscape and to contribute a little dignity and formality to the riotous caprices of this violet-crowned vale.

See also

 List of museums in Central Texas

References

External links

The Contemporary Austin Website

Museums in Austin, Texas
Art museums and galleries in Texas
Historic house museums in Texas
Art museums established in 1961
1961 establishments in Texas